The Lishipa is a tribal group found in the Dirang area in the West Kameng district of Arunachal Pradesh in India. They are ethnically related to both the Chugpa and Monpa, in which they are officially classified as a tribe of the Monpa. However, the relative affinity of their linguistic origins to the Sherdukpen, Sulung and Bugun that rendered their distinct identity from the Monpas. The tribe boasts about 1,000 individuals.

As they were the descendants of the early waves of immigrants that came from Tibet, they have a lower social status than the Monpa. Their houses are constructed from stone and wood with plank floors, with the roof made from Bamboo. Like the Monpa, they are Tibetan Buddhist by religion.

Their language is grouped with a number of other languages of the area as Kho-Bwa. It is possibly of Tibeto-Burman derivation.

References 

 Tshangla language
Sumi Krishna. Gender Dimensions in Biodiversity Management : India. Report submitted to FAO Regional Office for Asia and the Pacific, Bangkok, Thailand. June 1997.

Tribes of Arunachal Pradesh
Buddhist communities of India